Prince Djahangir Mirza (1810-1853) Persian Prince of Qajar dynasty, was the third son of Abbas Mirza, the crown prince and governor of Azerbaijan, who in turn was the son of Fat′h Ali Shah Qajar, the second Shah of the Qajar dynasty. 

After the death of his father in 1832, Ghaem Magham Farahani arrested him in Tabriz and put him to jail in Ardebil. He was blinded on the order of his brother, Mohammad Shah. He had 5 sons and 2 daughters from his wife Delshad Khanum. He died at the age of 43 in Mecca. He was buried in the shrine of Fatema Mæ'sume in the city of Qom.

Sons
 Hossein Mirza
 Fathollah Mirza
 Masoud Mirza
 Sanjar Mirza
 Salim Mirza

Notes and references 

Qajar princes
1810 births
1853 deaths
19th-century Iranian people